Mohsen Hamidi (born September 30, 1985) is an Iranian football midfielder who most recently played for Sanat Naft in the Persian Gulf Pro League.

Club career

Club career statistics

 Assist Goals

References

External links

1985 births
Living people
Iranian footballers
Association football midfielders
Foolad FC players
Shahin Bushehr F.C. players
Sepahan S.C. footballers
Iranian Arab sportspeople
Aluminium Hormozgan F.C. players
Sanat Naft Abadan F.C. players
PAS Hamedan F.C. players
Esteghlal Ahvaz players
Gostaresh Foulad F.C. players
People from Ahvaz
Sportspeople from Khuzestan province